Daniel Lévi (26 August 1961 – 6 August 2022) was a French singer-songwriter, composer, and pianist.

Biography
Lévi was born in Constantine, French Algeria into a Jewish family.  He spent his childhood in Lyon, where he was preparing for his job as a musician studying piano for a decade at the conservatory in the city. In 1983, he composed and recorded his first album entitled Cocktail. In 1991, he took part in the musical produced by Catherine Lara Sand et les Romantiques, on the stage of the Chatelet in which he portrayed Alfred de Musset and Frédéric Chopin. In 1993, he was hired by Disney Studios to record a duet with Karine Costa, the song of the animated feature Aladdin : "Ce Rêve bleu". In 1996, AB studios opened their doors to record his second album Entre parenthèses which was entirely composed by him. Then in 2000, he played the role of Moses in Élie Chouraqui and Pascal Obispo's musical Les Dix Commandements. He had huge success with the hit single "L'Envie d'aimer". After the triumph of the musical, Lévi decided to begin again to compose. In October 2002, he released his third album entitled Ici et Maintenant. In January 2005, his fourth album Le Cœur ouvert was produced in collaboration with Pascal Obispo.

Discography

Albums

Compilation albums
2017: Daniel Lévi
2019: 50 et quelques (Best of)
2021: Grâce à toi

Singles

Songs
1984: "Fou de toi"
1985: "Belle africaine"
1985: 'Falaise bleue"
1986: "L'amour au cœur"
1992: "Aime moi comme ton enfant" (with Catherine Lara)
1992: "Ce reve bleu" (with Karine Costa)
1996: "Change rien"
1997: "Elle est soleil"
2000: "L'envie d'aimer"
2001: "Mon frère" (with Ahmed Mouici)
2002: "Ici et maintenant"
2003: "L'enfant"
2004: "L'amour qu'il faut"
2005: "La peine de vivre"
2005: "Je meurs d'envie de Vous"
2017: "Un jour se lève"
2018: "Les Yeux De Mon Enfance" (en duo avec Nicolas Reyes)
2018: "Ce Soir"
2019: "Libre Sur Sa Terre"
2019: "Comme Un Homme"
2020: "Si On Peut"
2020: "Toi, Moi, Nous, Eux, Lui, Vous"
2020: "Les Gens Bien"

Appearances
1991: Sand et les Romantiques – in role of Chopin and Musset
1993: Aladdin of Disney – "Ce rêve bleu" (with Karine Costa) rom soundtrack of film
2000: Les Dix Commandements – in role of Moses
2001: L'Odyssée des Enfoirés
2001: Feelings : Hommage à Loulou Gasté

DVDs

2001: Les Dix Commandements
2001: L'Odyssée des Enfoirés
2013: Daniel Lévi, Live in Neguev
2013: Daniel Lévi, Live Casino de Paris

References

External links
Official site
Forum about Daniel Lévi
 
 

1961 births
2022 deaths
Musicians from Lyon
French male singers
French pop singers
French singer-songwriters
Algerian Jews
Pieds-Noirs
Jewish songwriters
People from Constantine, Algeria
French male singer-songwriters
Deaths from cancer in France
Deaths from colorectal cancer